Mashahran (also Romanized as Māshahrān and Māshehrān; also known as Māh Shahrān and Māshahrān-e Now) is a village in Tiab Rural District, in the Central District of Minab County, Hormozgan Province, Iran. At the 2006 census, its population was 464, in 91 families.

References 

Populated places in Minab County